The Navy was a magazine published by the United States Navy from 1907 to 1916. Some volumes are available online through Google Books.

References

External links

1907 establishments in the United States
1916 disestablishments in the United States
Defunct magazines published in the United States
English-language magazines
Magazines established in 1907
Magazines disestablished in 1916
Magazines published in Washington, D.C.